Fenland is a local government district in Cambridgeshire, England. It was historically part of the Isle of Ely and borders the city of Peterborough to the northwest, Huntingdonshire to the west, and East Cambridgeshire to the southeast. It also borders the Lincolnshire district of South Holland to the north and the Norfolk district of King's Lynn and West Norfolk to the northeast. The administrative centre is in March.

The population of the district was 98,262 at the 2011 Census.

It was formed on 1 April 1974, with the merger of the Borough of Wisbech, Chatteris Urban District, March Urban District, Whittlesey Urban District, North Witchford Rural District and Wisbech Rural District.
In 2022 the council was reported to be the second most complained about in the county.

Settlements in Fenland District 
Its council covers the market towns of Chatteris, March, Whittlesey and Wisbech (which is often called the "Capital of the Fens"). Other villages and hamlets in the district include:

Benwick
Christchurch
Doddington
Elm
Coldham
Friday Bridge
Ring's End
Gorefield
Leverington
Manea
Newton-in-the-Isle
Tydd St Giles
Wimblington 
Wisbech St Mary. 
The latter includes Guyhirn and Parson Drove.

Governance

Fenland District Council is elected every four years, with currently (2020) thirty nine councillors. Since 1976 the Conservative Party has held control of the council, apart from a period after 1995 when Labour had control, the Conservatives regained a majority at the 1999 election. As of June 2022, the council composition is:

In the May 2019 elections, twelve councillors – all Conservative – were returned without a vote to Fenland District Council, which topped the Electoral Reform Society's list of 'rotten boroughs'.

Economy

The local economy has traditionally been built upon farming and food related industry. The food industry is now well established, and related processing, storage, packaging and distribution has become more sophisticated and diverse. The predominantly rural economy of the area also includes a strong industrial tradition, including brewing, brick making, can making, pet food production, printing and engineering, and many local residents commute outside the district to work or study.
The River Nene provides access to the sea via the Port of Wisbech. Other waterways provide opportunities for angling and other water based activities. Marinas are located in Wisbech and March.

The council run markets in three of the towns (the market in Wisbech is run by Wisbech Town Council) and a number of festivals and other events.

A proposal for a new Fenland rail link was agreed in June 2020.

Fenland council gave £370,400 to its chief executive Tim Pilsbury when he took early retirement in 2010–11.

Awareness and promotion 

The term "Fen Tiger" is associated with the fens. A flag with a tiger is now linked with this part of the county.

A number of organisations such as the Fenland Archaeological Society (FenArch) and publications such as the Fenland Citizen and The Fens magazine cover much or all of the district. The Wisbech & Fenland Museum for many years was the only museum covering the district. In recent years the Fenland Poet Laurate awards have been eligible for local poets.

Twin towns and sister cities
Fenland is twinned with:
Nettetal in Kreis Viersen in Germany
Cook County, New Zealand
Sunshine Coast, Australia

Further reading

See also
 Fenland Survey
 The Fens

References

External links
 Fenland District Council

 
Non-metropolitan districts of Cambridgeshire